Pawling Hall is a historic meeting hall located at Hagaman in Montgomery County, New York, US. It was built in 1891 and is a simple two-story, brick masonry building with a gable roof in the Italianate style.  It incorporates a meeting hall, small performance stage, and village government offices.

It was added to the National Register of Historic Places in 2002.

References

Event venues on the National Register of Historic Places in New York (state)
Italianate architecture in New York (state)
Cultural infrastructure completed in 1891
Buildings and structures in Montgomery County, New York
1891 establishments in New York (state)
National Register of Historic Places in Montgomery County, New York